The Badger-Gopher Conference was a short-lived college athletics conference composed of member schools located in the states of Minnesota and Wisconsin. The league existed from 1958 to 1962.

Football champions

 1958 – 
 1959 –  and 
 1960 – 
 1961 –

See also
 List of defunct college football conferences

References